Military Technical Museum Lešany is a museum of military vehicles located in Lešany in the Central Bohemian Region of the Czech Republic. Its exposition contains over 700 historic tanks, cannons, motorcycles, armored vehicles, trucks, military passenger vehicles, missile systems and other military equipment manufactured from 1890 to the present.

History and presentation

The museum was established in 1996 in a former artillery barracks in the municipality of Lešany, near Týnec nad Sázavou. The collections are presented in ten halls, six roofed areas and also in the open air. Since 2003, a so-called "Tank Day" is held every year at the end of the season (usually end of August/beginning of September) in the area of the museum, where many of the tanks and other military vehicles from the museum's collection are presented in dynamic displays. The Army of the Czech Republic participates in these events, therefore current military equipment of the Czech Army can also be seen on display. There are also events at the beginning of every season (in May) which are usually dedicated to other branches of ground equipment, like "Artillery day", "AAA day", "Tatra day", etc.

The collection
WWI and the interwar period
featuring for example: Fiat 18 BLR, Nash Quad, MU-4 tankette, Praga RV, Tatra 27

World War II: Axis
featuring for example: Panzer 35(t), Panzer 38(t), Panzer IV, Hetzer, Krupp Protze, HORCH 108, VW type 82 Kübelwagen, Volkswagen Schwimmwagen, Steyr 1500 A, Stoewer R 200, Tempo G1200, SPA TL 37, Sd.Kfz. 2 Kettenkrad, BMW R-35, 15cm Nebelwerfer 41, LG 42, Tatra 111, Tatra 57K, Škoda 956, 8.8 cm FlaK, 7.5 cm Pak 97/38, 15 cm sFH 18

World War II: Allies and Neutral Powers
featuring for example: M4A1 Sherman, M4A3 Sherman, M36, M3A1 Stuart, Cromwell, Comet, T-34/76, T-34/85, IS-2, IS-3, SU-76, SU-100, ISU-152, Praga LTP, Praga LTH, Strv m/37, LVT-4, GMC CCKW 353, Harley-Davidson WLA, Dodge WC-52, Dodge WC-54, Dodge WC-57, M3A1 Scout Car, M16 MGMC, Ford GPW, Humber Scout Car, Bedford MWC, Universal Carrier, Morris Commercial C8 Quad, Scammell Pioneer SV2S, Austin K6, Bedford QLT, BM-13, BA-64B, GAZ-67B, Stalinets S-65, ZiS-3, QF 25 pounder, Sav m/43, Bofors 40 mm gun

Cold War: East
featuring for example: T-54, T-55, PT-76, T-72, 2S1 Gvozdika, 2S4 Tyulpan, 2S7 Pion, 152mm SpGH DANA, ZSU-57-2, BMP-1, BMP-2, OT-62 TOPAS, BTR-60, OT-64 SKOT, OT-65, ShM-120 PRAM, BM-21 Grad, RM-51, RM-70, SA-4 Ganef, SA-8 Gecko, SA-9 Gaskin, FROG-7, SS-23 Spider, SS-1c SCUD-B, SS-21 Scarab, 9P148 Konkurs, 9P19 launcher, SA-5 Gammon, R-330P, KRTP-86 Tamara, GAZ-46 MAV, Praga V3S, UAZ-469, ZIL-131, Tatra 805, Tatra 813

Cold War: West
featuring for example: Centurion, Chieftain, M47 Patton, M48 Patton, M60 Patton, Merkava Mk.I, Leopard 1, AMX-13, Panhard EBR, Alvis Saracen, Ferret Mk.2/3, DAF YA 126, M561 Gama Goat, Unimog S404, DKW Munga, Dodge M37, M151, Bv 202, Vkp m/42, Pbv 301

Modern
featuring for example: T-72M3CZ, HMMWV, Toyota Hilux SCV

Gallery

References

Museums in the Central Bohemian Region
Military and war museums in the Czech Republic
Tank museums
1996 establishments in the Czech Republic
Museums established in 1996
20th-century architecture in the Czech Republic